Jasti Chelameswar (born 23 June 1953) is the former Judge of Supreme Court of India. He retired on 22 June 2018 as the second most senior Supreme court judge. Earlier, he was the Chief Justice of Kerala High Court and Gauhati High Court. He was also one of the 4 judges who held a controversial press conference against the Chief Justice of India Justice Dipak Misra.

Early life
Chelameswar was born in Peddamuttevi village of Movva mandal, Krishna district, Andhra Pradesh, the son of Jasti Lakshminarayana, a lawyer who practised at the district court, and his wife Annapoornamma. After completing his schooling in Machilipatnam, Chelameswar enrolled at Loyola College, Chennai and obtained a Bachelor's degree in Science with Physics as his major subject. He then studied Law and obtained an LLB from Andhra University, Visakhapatnam in 1976.

Career
Chelameswar served as an Additional Judge at the then High Court of Andhra Pradesh. Later, he became the Chief Justice of
Gauhati High Court in 2007. He was later transferred as the Chief Justice of the Kerala High Court and was elevated as a Judge, Supreme Court of India in October 2011.

According to an Op-Ed in The Economic Times:

Notable Judgements

Freedom of Speech

Chelameswar and Rohinton Fali Nariman formed the two judge bench of the Supreme Court of India which struck down a controversial law which gave Indian police the power to arrest anyone accused of posting emails or other electronic messages which "causes annoyance or inconvenience". The judges held Section 66A of the Information Technology Act, which made such offenses punishable up to three years imprisonment, to be unconstitutional. According to Chelameswar and Nariman, several terms in the law they were striking down were "open-ended, undefined and vague" which made them nebulous in nature. According to the judges: "What may be offensive to one may not be offensive to another. What may cause annoyance or inconvenience to one may not cause annoyance or inconvenience to another.”

In their judgement the judges clarified that a distinction needs to be made between discussion, advocacy, and incitement. Any discussion, or advocacy of even an unpopular cause cannot be restricted, and it is only when such discussion or advocacy reaches the level of incitement whereby it causes public disorder or affects the security of the state can it be curbed.

The judgement has been welcomed for defending the Indian Constitution's ideals of tolerance and the Constitutional provisions of free speech. It has been pointed out that the controversial law struck down by Chelameswar and Nariman had gained notoriety after many people in India started getting arrested for seemingly innocuous reasons on the grounds that they had violated the now scrapped law.

Aadhaar
A three judge bench of the Indian Supreme Court, comprising Chelameswar, Sharad Arvind Bobde, and Chokkalingam Nagappan, ratified an earlier order of the Supreme Court and clarified that no Indian citizen without an Aadhaar card can be deprived of basic services and government subsidies. This ratification by the three judge bench however was made invalid by the subsequent judgements of the Supreme Court and notifications by the Government of India making Aadhar mandatory for basic services and government subsidies.

National Judicial Appointments Commission (NJAC) verdict
In his dissenting opinion in the NJAC verdict (2015), Chelameswar had criticised the collegium system of appointing judges, which he said has become "a euphemism for nepotism" where "mediocrity or even less" is promoted and a "constitutional disorder" does not look distant.

References

1953 births
20th-century Indian judges
21st-century Indian judges
Living people
Justices of the Supreme Court of India
Telugu people
People from Krishna district
Judges of the Andhra Pradesh High Court
Chief Justices of the Gauhati High Court
Chief Justices of the Kerala High Court
Andhra University alumni
Loyola College, Chennai alumni
Indian judges